Mevania is a genus of moths in the subfamily Arctiinae. The genus was erected by Francis Walker in 1854.

Species
 Mevania albofasciata Rothschild, 1912
 Mevania basalis Walker, 1864
 Mevania larissa Druce, 1890
 Mevania quadricolor Walker, 1854

References

External links

Euchromiina
Moth genera